Lactococcus nasutitermitis  is a bacterium from the genus Lactococcus which has been isolated from the gut of the termite Nasutitermes hainanensis.

References

 

Streptococcaceae
Bacteria described in 2016